De toutes mes forces is a 2017 French drama film directed by Chad Chenouga.

Plot
Nassim, a 16-year-old boy who is placed with a family in the suburbs following the death of his drug addict mother. But he refuses to integrate into the social setting that surrounds him. He invents another life for himself, similar to that of his mates at the big Parisian high school he goes to. There's no reason for that to change. His two lives, his home life and his school life, must be kept separate at all costs.

Cast
 Khaled Alouach as Nassim
 Yolande Moreau as Madame Cousin
 François Guignard as Benjamin
 Jisca Kalvanda as Zawady
 Laurent Xu as Kevin
 Daouda Keita as Moussa
 Aboudou Sacko as Brahim
 Sabri Nouioua as Ryan
 Fadila Belkebla
 Myriam Mansouri
 Chloé Mons
 Elodie Gouraud
 Marine Moal

Production
The movie is shot in Pau, Pyrénées-Atlantiques and Paris, between March and May 2016. The shooting lasted four weeks.

References

External links
 

2017 drama films
French drama films
2010s French-language films
2017 films
2010s French films